Pinnawala Central College (Sinhala: පින්නවල මධ්‍ය මහා විද්‍යාලය Pinnawala Madhya Mahā Vidyālaya) (Tamil: பின்னவல மத்திய மஹா கல்லூரி Pinnawala Maththiya Maha Kalloori) also known as the Pinnawala National School or Pinnawala Central is a public school near Pinnawala in Sri Lanka.

The college is funded by the Ministry of Education, which appoints its principal, and falls within the Mawanella Education zone. The principal is the head of the administration of the college and is assisted by a vice principal. The college educates close to 2,800 students for their secondary education (Grade 6-13).The college hostels are administered by the warden under the supervision of the principal and assisted by a sub-warden.

History
There were no written records from 1882 to 1926. According to the written history, Mr. Brampisingo was the first principal, appointed for 1920-1926. In the beginning, there were only a few classes covered local syllabus for grade 1 to 5. In 1956, the school was upgraded to a mixed(co-educational) school. The school student population also got increased drastically from 1926 to 1958 and new buildings and staff were added to the school. A contribution was offered by philanthropist and late minister N. H. Keerthiratne and S. A. Lokubandara Bentota.

In 1963, the opportunity was obtained to follow the Advanced Level Examination in Arts stream and increased the classes from grades 1-12 and laid the path for more students to enroll at the school. Students were allowed to enter the Advanced Level in the science stream in 1964 and later in the commerce stream; it became a national school on 12 September 1995 with grades 6-13.

The school's own land was expanded to  hosting 45 buildings. The school offers a large rectangular playground, a library, an audio-visual unit laboratory, for G.C.E. O/L, Information Technology unit, Home Science unit, Agriculture unit, Aesthetic unit, Scout troop, Cadet unit, and Environmental unit.

Houses

The students are divided into four houses. These are led by House Captains, competing in all major games to win the inter-house games and house colors are awarded winners. The houses are:

Special Events
In 2017, a two-day training for Sepaktakraw was scheduled to be held at Pinnawala Central College grounds for the eight schools of the Kegalle District and Uva/Sabaragamuwa Provinces by invitation from the President of the newly formed Sri Lanka Schools Sepak Takraw Association, Wasantha Kumara. Players from Pinnawala Central College planned to compete at the sport's world championship in Thailand the same year.

Notable alumni 

This is a list of notable alumni from Pinnawala Central College.

References

1882 establishments in Ceylon
Educational institutions established in 1882
National schools in Sri Lanka
Schools in Kegalle District